Pygot is a surname. Notable people with the surname include:

Margaret Pygot, 15th century English prioress
William Pygot, Protestant martyr
Francis Pygot, High Sheriff of Buckinghamshire in 1527